Brown & Brown, Inc. (Brown & Brown Insurance) is a leading insurance brokerage firm, delivering risk management solutions to individuals and businesses since 1939. Headquartered in Daytona Beach, Florida, Brown & Brown has 450+ locations worldwide.

In 2021 the company ranked as the fifth largest independent insurance brokerage in the U.S. and sixth largest in the world by Business Insurance magazine.

History
Brown & Brown was co-founded by J. Adrian Brown in 1939. His son, J. Hyatt Brown, became CEO in 1961, a position he held until 2009. Under Hyatt, Brown & Brown expanded from a small local, family-owned insurance agency with a single office in Daytona Beach to the nation's top insurance brokerages with offices nationwide.

Acquisition
In March 2022, it was announced Brown & Brown had completed the acquisition two property-focused insurance companies - Florida-based Orchid Underwriters Agency and Texas-based CrossCover Insurance Services.

In June of 2022, Brown & Brown acquired Profits Creation, a vehicle dealer supplier, for an undisclosed sum.

Brown & Brown extended their reach in the United Kingdom when they acquired Global Risk Partners in 2022.

References

External links

Pet Insurance Information

Insurance companies of the United States
Companies listed on the New York Stock Exchange
Financial services companies established in 1939
Companies based in Volusia County, Florida
Insurance companies based in Florida
Daytona Beach, Florida